Bence Lázár (21 March 1991 – 22 February 2018) was a Hungarian footballer (striker) who last played for Újpest FC. He retired from professional football in 2014 at the age of 23 after serious back problems. In 2015, he was diagnosed with leukemia.

Lázár died on 22 February 2018, aged 26.

Club career
He made his debut against Kaposvári Rákóczi FC on 26 February 2011. In this match, he scored twice.

Honours
Újpest
Hungarian Cup (1): 2013–14

References

External links
 

1991 births
2018 deaths
People from Kecskemét
Hungarian footballers
Association football forwards
Hungary youth international footballers
Újpest FC players
SV Würmla players
Nyíregyháza Spartacus FC players
Nemzeti Bajnokság I players
Hungarian expatriate footballers
Expatriate footballers in Austria
Hungarian expatriate sportspeople in Austria
Deaths from leukemia
Deaths from cancer in Hungary
Sportspeople from Bács-Kiskun County